The 2020 Chinese Super League, officially known as the 2020 Ping An Chinese Football Association Super League for sponsorship reasons, was the 17th season since the establishment of the Chinese Super League. The league title sponsor is Ping An Insurance. The season was scheduled to begin on 22 February and to end on 31 October, but was postponed following the COVID-19 pandemic. On 1 July 2020, Chinese Football Association announced that the season would be split into two stages. In the first stage, which began on 25 July 2020 and concluded on 29 September 2020, 16 teams were split into two groups in two locations, one in Dalian and the other in Suzhou. On 2 September 2020, Chinese Football Association announced that the second stage would begin on 16 October 2020 and conclude on 12 November 2020. Jiangsu Suning F.C. beat defending champions Guangzhou Evergrande Taobao 2-1 on aggregate in the finals to win their first-ever top-tier league title. However, three months later, Jiangsu F.C. was dissolved. As a result, the 4th-ranked team Shanghai SIPG gained the place to compete in 2021 AFC Champions League along with Guangzhou F.C. and Beijing Guoan, while Shijiazhuang Ever Bright escaped relegation.

Club changes
Clubs promoted from 2019 China League One
 Qingdao Huanghai
 Shijiazhuang Ever Bright

Clubs relegated to 2020 China League One
 Beijing Renhe

Dissolved entries
 Tianjin Tianhai

Name changes
 Dalian Yifang F.C. changed their name to Dalian Pro in January 2020.

Clubs

Stadiums and locations

Locations

Managerial changes

Coach nationality

Foreign players

Foreign players: The number of foreign players (excluding goalkeepers) that clubs can register over the course of the season is increased from six to seven and the number of foreign players allowed on each CSL team at any given time is also increased from four to five. A maximum of five foreign players can be registered for each match with a maximum of four can be fielded at any time during the match.
Naturalized players: There is no limits in registering naturalized players. There is no limits in fielding Chinese-descent naturalized players. However, only one non-Chinese-descent naturalized player can be fielded as native player while other non-Chinese-descent naturalized player(s) fielded will be counted as foreign player(s).
Hong Kong, Macau, or Taiwan players: Each club can register one Hong Kong, Macau, or Taiwan player of Chinese descent (excluding goalkeepers), provided that he was registered as a professional footballer in one of those three associations for the first time in his career, as a native player.

Players name in bold indicates the player is registered during the mid-season transfer window.

 For Hong Kong, Macau, or Taiwanese players, if they are non-naturalized and were registered as professional footballers in Hong Kong's, Macau's, or Chinese Taipei's football association for the first time, they are recognized as native players. Otherwise they are recognized as foreign players.

Regular season

Group A

Stadiums
Dalian Sports Center
Dalian Youth Football Training Base Main Stadium
Jinzhou Stadium
Puwan Stadium (Reserve)

League table

Results

Positions by round

Results by match played

Group B

Stadiums
Kunshan Stadium
Suzhou Olympic Sports Centre
Suzhou Sports Center
Changshu Stadium (Reserve)

League table

Results

Positions by round

Results by match played

Championship stage

Bracket

Quarter-finals

First leg (Round 15)

Second leg (Round 16)

Guangzhou Evergrande Taobao won 8–1 on aggregate.

Beijing Sinobo Guoan won 4–3 on aggregate.

1–1 on aggregate. Shanghai SIPG won 5–4 on penalties.

Jiangsu Suning won 2–1 on aggregate.

Semi-finals
The winners will qualify for the 2021 AFC Champions League group stage.

First leg (Round 17)

Second leg (Round 18)

Guangzhou Evergrande Taobao won 3–1 on aggregate.

Jiangsu Suning won 3–2 on aggregate.

5th–8th place playoffs

First leg (Round 17)

Second leg (Round 18)

Shandong Luneng Taishan won 8–5 on aggregate.

3–3 on aggregate. Chongqing Dangdai Lifan won 10–9 on penalties.

7th–8th place playoffs

First leg (Round 19)

Second leg (Round 20)

Shanghai Greenland Shenhua won 5–1 on aggregate.

5th–6th place playoffs

First leg (Round 19)

Second leg (Round 20)

5–5 on aggregate. Shandong Luneng Taishan won 4–3 on penalties.

3rd–4th place playoffs
The winner qualified for the 2021 AFC Champions League qualifying play-offs.

First leg (Round 19)

Second leg (Round 20)

Beijing Sinobo Guoan won 3–2 on aggregate.

Finals

First leg (Round 19)

Second leg (Round 20)

Jiangsu Suning won 2–1 on aggregate.

Relegation stage

Bracket

9th–16th place playoffs

First leg (Round 15)

Second leg (Round 16)

Tianjin TEDA won 3–1 on aggregate.

Dalian Pro won 3–2 on aggregate.

Henan Jianye won 2–1 on aggregate.

Guangzhou R&F won 2–1 on aggregate.

9th–12th place playoffs

First leg (Round 17)

Second leg (Round 18)

Tianjin TEDA won 3–2 on aggregate.

Henan Jianye won 5–3 on aggregate.

13th–16th place playoffs

First leg (Round 17)

Second leg (Round 18)

Shenzhen won 3–2 on aggregate.

3–3 on aggregate. Qingdao Huanghai won 5–4 on penalties.

15th–16th place playoffs
The winner of the playoff will qualify to the relegation play-offs, whereas the loser will be directly relegated to the 2021 China League One.

First leg (Round 19)

Second leg (Round 20)

Wuhan Zall won 2–1 on aggregate.

13th–14th place playoffs

First leg (Round 19)

Second leg (Round 20)

Shenzhen won 4–1 on aggregate.

11th–12th place playoffs

First leg (Round 19)

Second leg (Round 20)

Guangzhou R&F won 4–3 on aggregate.

9th–10th place playoffs

First leg (Round 19)

Second leg (Round 20)

Henan Jianye won 2–1 on aggregate.

Relegation play-offs

Overview

Matches

First leg

Second leg

Wuhan Zall won 3–2 on aggregate and stayed in the Chinese Super League.

Final ranking

Goalscorers

Top scorers
Source:

Top assists

Source:

Hat-tricks

Awards

Players of the Round
The following players were named the Players of the Round.

League attendance

References

External links
Current CSL table, and recent results/fixtures at Soccerway

Chinese Super League seasons
1
China
Chinese Super League